Mark van Eeuwen (born 23 July 1976) is a Dutch actor. He is known for his role as Jack van Houten in the long-running soap opera Goede tijden, slechte tijden.

Career 

He played the role of criminal Frans Meijer in the 2015 film Kidnapping Freddy Heineken. He also played in the 2018 film Redbad.

In 2013, he participated in an episode of the game show De Jongens tegen de Meisjes.

In 2016, he played the role of Peter in The Passion, a Dutch Passion Play held every Maundy Thursday since 2011.

Personal life 

Van Eeuwen has been in relationships with actress Lieke van Lexmond and model Kim Kötter.

Filmography

As actor 

 Snowfever (2004)
 Voetbalvrouwen (2007)
 Kidnapping Freddy Heineken (2015)
 Rendez-vous (2015)
 Alles voor elkaar (2017)
 Redbad (2018)
 Blijf van mijn kind (2018)
 Flikken Rotterdam (2016-2021)
 The Forgotten Battle (2020)
 Stromboli (2022)

As contestant 

 De Jongens tegen de Meisjes (2013)

References

External links 
 
 

1976 births
Living people
20th-century Dutch male actors
21st-century Dutch male actors
Dutch male film actors
People from Warnsveld